The 2015 Toledo mayoral special election was held on November 3, 2015, to determine the mayor of Toledo, Ohio and to finish the term of former mayor D. Michael Collins who died in office.

Incumbent acting mayor Paula Hicks-Hudson was elected mayor with 35.63% of the vote.

Candidates
Michael Bell, former mayor of Toledo
Sandy Drabik Collins, former director of Ohio Department of Administrative Services and widow of former mayor D. Michael Collins
Opal Covey, perennial candidate
Mike Ferner, former city councilor
Carty Finkbeiner, former mayor of Toledo
Paula Hicks-Hudson, incumbent acting mayor of Toledo and former city council president
Sandy Spang, city councilor

Debates

Results

References

2015
2015 Ohio elections
Toledo